The Knights of Peter Claver and Ladies Auxiliary is an international Catholic fraternal service order. Founded in 1909 by the Josephites and parishioners from Most Pure Heart of Mary Catholic Church in Mobile, Alabama, it is the largest and oldest Black Catholic lay-led organization still in existence.

History

Founding 

The organization was founded in 1909 by a group including Josephite father Conrad Friedrich Rebesher, a native of Kłodawa, Poland and pastor of Most Pure Heart of Mary Parish; 3 other Josephite priests: Father Samuel Joseph Kelly, Father Joseph Peter Van Baast, and Father John Henry Dorsey; and 3 Black laymen: Gilbert Faustina, Francis Xavier "Frank" Collins, and Francis "Frank" Trenier. Their initiation ceremony was attended by their bishop, Edward Patrick Allen.

The organization's model was based on other Catholic fraternal orders such as the Knights of Columbus, who at the time did not allow Black members in all of their councils. This reality illustrated the need for a Black Catholic fraternal order.

Early years 
The Sublimed and Meritorious Fourth Degree was organized in 1917. This division is open to Knights who after two years of continual membership have proven themselves to be active workers in the Church, the community, and the Noble Order.

A program for Junior Knights existed from the Order's earliest days. The constitution of the Junior Knights Division was adopted in 1917 and the division formally recognized in 1935. 

In 1922, a Ladies Auxiliary was formed to provide the same opportunities for Catholic action to African American lay women. The Auxiliary was officially recognized as a division of the Order in 1926. The Junior Daughters division was officially recognized in 1930.

Conflict 
During the 1920s, Thomas Wyatt Turner's Federated Colored Catholics locked horns with the KPC over their reticence to speak out on racism and segregation. 

The conflict eventually resulted in the expulsion of Bro. Marcellus Dorsey, the brother of KPC co-founder Fr Dorsey (a member of the Josephites, which then restricted Black applicants). This was mainly due to Marcellus criticizing the Josephites in the press.

The order would come to oppose segregation openly beginning in 1939.

Modern era 
In more recent years, order has responded to the charitable appeals of many national and international organizations such as the NAACP, the United Negro College Fund, Catholic elementary and secondary schools, Xavier University of Louisiana, the National Urban League, the Sickle Cell Anemia Foundation, The Sister Thea Bowman Black Catholic Educational Foundation, the International Alliance of Catholic Knights, the National Black Catholic Congress, the National Black Catholic Clergy Caucus, the National Black Sisters Conference, and the National Council of Negro Women.

A Fourth Degree for the Auxiliary, the Ladies of Grace, was established for members of the Ladies Auxiliary in 1979.

In 2006, the U.S. Conference of Catholic Bishops renewed a grant to the organization to continue the National Environmental Health and Justice Literacy Project, a program designed to educate citizens of poor communities about environmental health hazards. Recently, the organization has provided disaster relief support on several occasions and has adopted numerous social justice causes as its mantra. Most notably, the Junior Division (youth) are promoting clean water initiatives and sufficient housing for the world's underserved in addition to their efforts to eradicate diabetes in the black community.

The order established their first and only collegiate units in 2018, at Xavier University of Louisiana.

Name 
The order is named after St. Peter Claver, a Jesuit priest from Spain who ministered to Africans enslaved in Cartagena, Colombia, South America, in the 17th century. Peter Claver is said to have converted more than 300,000 of them to Catholicism.

Organization 
The organization is active in the United States of America and South America. It has over 400 Councils (men) and Courts (ladies) throughout the U.S. and on San Andres Island in Colombia. For youths between the ages of 7 and 18 years old, the organization has Junior Councils (young men) and Junior Courts (young ladies).

Members of the Fourth Degree Knights are addressed as "Sir Knight," and members of the Fourth Degree Ladies of Grace are addressed as "Gracious Lady."

The Knights are member of the worldwide International Alliance of Catholic Knights.

Activities

Purposes 
 To support a local pastor, parish and bishop.
 To become active, as a group, in a Knights respective community.
 To instill civic pride & action.
 To engage Knights in opportunities that will allow them to demonstrate their Catholicism.
 To allow for social interaction by creating gatherings that might foster a sense of community.
 To provide for the awarding of scholarships.
 To develop the character of youth.
 To provide social and intellectual stimulation for its members

Ethos 
The Knights of Peter Claver and Ladies Auxiliary provides opportunities for all Catholics to be actively involved in their faith by living the Gospel message. The Knights of Peter Claver and Ladies Auxiliary engages in a variety of church and community service projects.

Supreme Knights and Supreme Ladies

Supreme Knights 
The following is a list of the Most Worthy Supreme Knights who have served as chief executive officers of the Knights of Peter Claver (and their terms of service):

 Gilbert Faustina † (1909–1926)
 Louis Israel † (1926–1940)
 Alphonse Pierre Auguste † (1941)
 John Henry Clouser † (1941–1946)
 Joseph Roland Prejean † (1946–1952)
 Beverly Victor Baranco Jr., KSG † (1952–1958)
 Eugene Boone Perry † (1958–1964)
 Shields Gilbert Gilmore † (1964–1970)
 Ernest Granger Sr., KSG † (1970–1976)
 Murry J. Frank † (1976–1982)
 Chester J. Jones, KSG (1982–1988)
 Paul Camille Condoll † (1988–1994)
 Andrew Jackie Elly (1994–2000)
 Arthur Cecil McFarland, Esq. (2000–2006)
 Gene Anthony Phillips Sr., KHS (2006–2010)
 Fredron DeKarlos Blackmon, OblSB, KHS (2010–2016)
 James Kenneth Ellis (2016–2022)
 Christopher Pichon (2022-)

Supreme Ladies 
The following is a list of the Most Esteemed Supreme Ladies who have served the Knights of Peter Claver Ladies Auxiliary (and their terms of service):

 Mary Lula Figaro Lunnon † (1926–1928)
 Alfaretta Ruth O'Ferrall Aubry † (1928–1952)
 Lucy Elizabeth Huff Jones † (1952–1958)
 Inez Young Bowman † (1958–1964)
 Thelma Perrault Lombard † (1964–1970)
 Florence Madeleine Woodfork Lee (1970–1976)
 Elise LeNoir Morris (1976–1982)
 Consuella Broussard † (1982–1988)
 Dorothy B. Henderson † (1988–1994)
 Leodia Gooch (1994–2000)
 Mary Louise Briers (2000–2006)
 Geralyn Carmouche Shelvin (2006–2012)
 Vertelle Amos Kenion (2012–2018)
 Micaela J. A. LeBlanc (2018–)

Buildings 
 The Peter Claver Building, a historic building in New Orleans, Louisiana served as national headquarters of the organization during 1951 to 1974, when a new, adjacent building was constructed. The KPC headquarters also served as the office space for the attorney A. P. Tureaud, Sr. during his crusade against legalized segregation.

Notable members 

 Cardinal Wilton D. Gregory, first-ever African-American cardinal
 Archbishop Shelton Fabre, past national chaplain
 Bishop Martin Holley, current National Chaplain
 A. P. Tureaud, Sr, famed black attorney who helped desegregate US schools
 Bishop Harold R. Perry, one of the first black bishops in the US and the first Black clergyman to open Congress with a prayer
 Bishop J. Terry Steib, SVD
 Auxiliary Bishop Joseph N. Perry
 Ralph Metcalfe, Olympic athlete and politician
 Ernest "Dutch" Morial, first Black mayor of New Orleans
 Sylvester O. Rhem, Chicago politician
 Bishop Kevin Vann
 Bishop David Talley
 Cardinal Raymond Burke
 Archbishop Allen Vigneron
 Bishop Robert Finn
 Bishop Charles Michael Jarrell
 Auxiliary Bishop David G. O'Connell
 Bishop Paul Loverde
 Bishop Eduardo Nevares
 Bishop David Toups

References

External links 
 
 

African-American history in New Orleans
Christianity in New Orleans
Christian organizations established in 1909
Organizations based in New Orleans
Knights of Peter Claver & Ladies Auxiliary
Catholic advocacy groups